"Walls of Red Wing" is a folk and protest song, written by American singer-songwriter Bob Dylan. Originally recorded for Dylan's second album, The Freewheelin' Bob Dylan, it was not included, and eventually attempted for his next work, The Times They Are a-Changin', but, again, this version was never released. The version recorded for Freewheelin'  eventually appeared on The Bootleg Series Volumes 1-3 (Rare & Unreleased) 1961-1991. The song describes a boys' reform school located in Red Wing, Minnesota.

Composition 
Dylan based "Walls of Red Wing" on the traditional Scottish folk ballad "The Road and the Miles to Dundee", which he may have learned during his trip to London in early 1963, from other aspiring folk singers, such as Martin Carthy. In his narration, Dylan goes to describe a juvenile detention center in Red Wing, Minnesota. The description is hyperbolical, and describes the students there as "thrown in like bandits and cast off like criminals", the walls of "barbed wire" and the fence with "electricity's sting", the guards holding their clubs like they were "kings", and the supposed "dungeon" of the building. Despite these harrowing descriptions, Red Wing was not the impenetrable "Gothic fortress" (as John Bauldie calls it) portrayed in this song.

Cover versions 
Joan Baez covered this song on her 1968 album Any Day Now; Ramblin' Jack Elliot covered it in 1997 on his album Friends of Mine.

References

External links 
 Lyrics at the official Bob Dylan website

1963 songs
Bob Dylan songs
Songs written by Bob Dylan